is a 1999 Japanese film directed by Takashi Ishii. The film stars Yūki Amami and Reiko Kataoka.

See also 
Kuro no tenshi Vol. 1

External links
 

1999 films
Films directed by Takashi Ishii
Films shot in Japan
1990s crime films
Japanese crime films
Girls with guns films
1990s Japanese films